Bob Bray (September 27, 1919 – August 26, 2006) was an American water polo player. He competed in the men's tournament at the 1948 Summer Olympics. In 1980, he was inducted into the USA Water Polo Hall of Fame.

References

External links
 

1919 births
2006 deaths
American male water polo players
Olympic water polo players of the United States
Water polo players at the 1948 Summer Olympics
Sportspeople from Los Angeles